The Nikon was the first camera introduced by the optical manufacturer Nippon Kogaku KK. It is a 35mm rangefinder camera, in retrospect known as the Nikon I. The original design was approved by September 1946, and the camera was released in March 1948. At first, it was sold locally, and it did not come to the attention of the western media until 1950, when photographers from the magazine  Life  were shown photographs taken with these cameras. The lenses draw special attention, like the Nikkor-P.C 1:2 f=8.5cm. A demand to fit Nikkors to the reporters' Leicas were immediately met at the factory in Tokyo, and soon the word spread about these Japanese lenses which were just as good as, or possibly better than their German counterparts. The camera design was strongly inspired by the German Contax and Leica cameras.  After careful studies of these, Nippon Kogaku had decided to base their camera on the Contax, but substitute the complicated shutter design for the cloth focal plane shutter of the Leica, these being considered the best features from either camera.

The original Nikon I, as introduced in 1948, had no flash synchronisation, but was otherwise a fully-fledged up-to-date rangefinder camera. The designers chose the 24 × 32 mm frame size pioneered by the Minolta 35 launched a year earlier by Chiyoda Kogaku, known as the Nippon format, which yielded more frames per length of film, and matched more closely the common paper sizes. However, the camera never caught on, because the US administration in Tokyo did not permit export to the US due to the non standard format, incompatible with the Kodak slide mounts.

In consequence, the Nikon M was introduced in the autumn 1949. This model is recognised by the M preceding the body number. Nippon Kogaku had settled for an intermediate frame format of 24 × 34 mm, hoping to find acceptance on the export market. Why Nippon Kogaku was reluctant to go all the way to the widely accepted standard size, is not fully understood, the camera itself seems prepared to accommodate the full frame size for the vast majority of situations. In fact, a new improved model was planned, retaining the non-standard frame format.

This was the Nikon S, long overdue when made available early in 1951; it is a Nikon M with flash sync contacts, two sockets at the upper left-hand edge of the body. All cameras sold with this feature are considered a Nikon S by the factory, even if marked M, though collectors do distinguish these as more valuable than the S.   The Nikon S sold well, and became the first Nikon imported to the US market.  A number of Nikon S cameras have one more serial number digit, known as the 8-digit Nikon S. When reaching 6099999 the engraver continued at 60910000, but it was soon realized that the long serial number was impractical, and after some 1200 cameras, the numbering reverted to 6100000. The 609 prefix in the serial number refers to the date the design was approved in September 1946.

Several further Nikon rangefinder models were introduced throughout the 1950s: the S2, S3, S4, and SP.  The latter three were built on the same frame with different features; the Nikon F SLR shares the basic body configuration of the latest rangefinder models.

See also 
Nikon
Nikon SP
Nikon S4

References

External links 
 http://imaging.nikon.com/lineup/discontinue/filmcamera.htm#rangefinder

S
Japanese inventions